The 2018 Girls' Youth NORCECA Volleyball Championship was the eleventh edition of the bi-annual volleyball tournament. It was held in Tegucigalpa National Gymnasium, Tegucigalpa, Honduras from 25 August to 2 September among eight countries. The United States won the tournament and qualified for the 2019 FIVB Girls' World Championship along with Canada. United States player Jessica Mzurik won the Most Valuable Player award.

Qualification 
A total of 9 teams qualify for the 2018 Girls' Youth NORCECA Volleyball Championship. In addition to Honduras who qualified automatically as hosts, the other 8 teams qualify based on top 5 teams from the NORCECA U 18 Continental Ranking and the 3 Zonal Champions from the AFECAVOL, ECVA and CAZOVA, U-18 Zonal Championships. Mexico withdrew from the tournament and the event continued with only 8 teams.

Pool composition

Pool standing procedure
 Number of matches won
 Match points
 Points ratio
 Sets ratio
 Result of the last match between the tied teams

Match won 3–0: 5 match points for the winner, 0 match points for the loser
Match won 3–1: 4 match points for the winner, 1 match point for the loser
Match won 3–2: 3 match points for the winner, 2 match points for the loser

Preliminary round
All times are in Central Standard Time

Group A

Group B

Final round

Bracket

Quarterfinals

5th–8th Classification

Semifinals

7th place

5th place

3rd place

Final

Finals standing

Individual awards

Most Valuable Player

Best Setter

Best Opposite

Best Outside Hitters

Best Middle Blockers

Best Libero

Best Digger

Best Receiver

Best Server

Best Scorer

References
NORCECA

Women's NORCECA Volleyball Championship
NORCECA
2018 in Honduran sport
2018 in women's volleyball
August 2018 sports events in North America
September 2018 sports events in North America
International sports competitions hosted by Honduras
Sports competitions in Tegucigalpa